Gokulananda Singha, born on 26 November 1896 at the village of Madhabpur of Moulvibazar district of Bangladesh, was a poet, writer and social reformer.

References

20th-century Bangladeshi male writers
Bishnupriya Manipuri poets
1896 births
1962 deaths
20th-century Bangladeshi poets
Bangladeshi male poets
20th-century Indian poets
Indian male poets
Poets from Tripura